National Life Finance Corporation (NLFC)  was a governmental institution of Japan, which provided business loans to small enterprises that have difficulty obtaining loans from private financial institutions.

On October 1, 2008, NLFC was dissolved and merged into Japan Finance Corporation (JFC) .

Overview
Established: June 1, 1949
Branch Offices: 152
Head Office: 1-9-3 Ōtemachi Chiyoda Tokyo 100-0004 JAPAN
Capital: (100% funded by the government) ¥369 billion
Supervising Ministry: Ministry of Finance (Japan), Ministry of Health, Labour and Welfare (Japan)

See also
List of banks in Japan
Japan Finance Corporation (JFC) (ja 日本語)

External links
 NLFC website

Government-owned companies of Japan
Financial services companies established in 1949
Financial services companies disestablished in 2008
Financial services companies of Japan
Japanese companies disestablished in 2008
Japanese companies established in 1949